Non-Fiction is the debut studio album by American a cappella group Naturally 7, released on November 1, 2000, by Festplatte AG.

Track listing 
Opening Meditation (The Path I Take)
Theme From Mahogany
Sit - Back - Relax
WDRG - AM
Bridge Over Troubled Water
All Of You
At The Tone
Born To Worship
Last Days (Reprise)
Blessed Assurance
Y'All Hear Dat
Train
Last Days
Bless This House
Closing Meditation (The Path I Take)
Have I Ever Told You

2000 albums
Naturally 7 albums